Imeshjeh (also Romanized as Īmeshjeh; also known as  Īmīshjeh and Īmshījeh) is a village in Varqeh Rural District of the Central District of Charuymaq County, East Azerbaijan province, Iran. At the 2006 National Census, its population was 467 in 95 households. The following census in 2011 counted 418 people in 110 households. The latest census in 2016 showed a population of 331 people in 92 households; it was the largest village in its rural district.

References 

Charuymaq County

Populated places in East Azerbaijan Province

Populated places in Charuymaq County